The Chickamauga Lodge No. 221, Free and Accepted Masons, Prince Hall Affiliate, also known as Chickamauga Masonic Lodge No. 221, was built in 1924.  It was listed on the National Register of Historic Places in 2006.

It was built by members during 1921–24. As of 2006, it had been covered with red rolled asphalt siding since 1952. The NRHP nomination noted that the asphalt siding preserved the building and was installed during the NRHP-eligible historic period (i.e. more than 50 years before the NRHP listing date). However, the April 2011 photo (here, to the right) shows that the asphalt siding had been removed. 

As of 2006 the lodge continued to be an active lodge.  It has original wooden handcrafted lodge furnishings used for ceremonial meetings.

See also
 Prince Hall Freemasonry

References

Clubhouses on the National Register of Historic Places in Georgia (U.S. state)
Masonic buildings completed in 1924
Buildings and structures in Walker County, Georgia
Masonic buildings in Georgia (U.S. state)
National Register of Historic Places in Walker County, Georgia